Romances is the twelfth studio album by Mexican singer Luis Miguel, released on 12 August 1997, by WEA Latina. It is the third album of the Romance series, in which Miguel covers Latin songs from 1940 to 1978. Aside from Miguel, the production also involved arranger Bebu Silvetti, and Armando Manzanero, who directed all of Miguel's Romance albums. Romances consists of twelve cover versions and two new compositions by Manzanero and Silvetti. Recording took place in early 1997 at the Ocean Way recording studio in Los Angeles, California.

Romances has sold over 4.5 million copies and received platinum certifications in several Latin American countries, the United States and Spain. Miguel promoted the album by touring the United States, Latin America and Spain. Upon its release, Romances received generally positive reviews from music critics. They mainly praised his vocals and production of the album although few reviewers found the arrangements to be repetitive and the record too similar to its predecessors. The album earned Miguel several awards, including the Grammy Award for Best Latin Pop Performance in the United States. Six singles were released: "Por Debajo de la Mesa", "El Reloj", "Contigo (Estar Contigo)", "De Quererte Así (De T'Avoir Aimee)", "Bésame Mucho", and "Sabor a Mí".

Background 
In 1991 Miguel released Romance, a collection of classic Latin ballads, the oldest of which dates back to the 1940s. The album was produced by Armando Manzanero and arranged by Bebu Silvetti, and was credited for revitalizing the bolero genre. It also made history as the first Spanish-language album to be certified gold by the Recording Industry Association of America (RIAA) in the United States. A follow-up to Romance was released in 1994 under the title Segundo Romance (Second Romance), which was produced by Miguel, Juan Carlos Calderón and Kiko Cibrian. Both albums received a platinum certification by the RIAA in the United States and also became successful in countries outside of Latin America and the United States, such as Finland and Saudi Arabia, selling over twelve million copies combined.

In December 1996 Miguel held a press conference in Buenos Aires, Argentina, where he announced his desire to record a third Romance album and mentioned the possibility of working with Manzanero and Juan Gabriel. He also expressed an interest in singing in Italian and Portuguese, although the album's songs are originally all in Spanish. Two months later Manzanero confirmed that he was working with Miguel on another bolero-inspired ballads album, under the tentative title Tercer Romance ("Third Romance"). Miguel's record label confirmed that fourteen tracks would be included on the album under the title Romances.

Recording and musical style

Miguel collaborated with Silvetti for the arrangement of Romances, while Manzanero was in charge of direction.  Recording began on 18 March 1997, at Ocean Way Recording in Hollywood and at The Hit Factory in New York City. During the recording of Romances, as in Romance, Silvetti employed his signature style of arrangements known as the "Silvetti Sound", which Leila Cobo of Billboard describes as "anchored in sweeping melodies, lush string arrangements, acoustic instrumentation, and above all, unabashed romanticism". Silvetti has stated that when he produces an album he does not simply copy his own arrangements, because he feels that would be "ridiculous", and prefers to be creative within his own style. About the selection of songs for the album, Manzanero stated that "I give [Miguel] the songs, and he chooses what he wants to record." Participants in the recording sessions included sixty-one musicians from the Los Angeles Philharmonic.

Miguel covers twelve ballads in Romances, including songs by José Antonio Méndez, Carlos Arturo Briz, Consuelo Velázquez Álvaro Carrillo, Roberto Cantoral, María Grever, Enrique Santos Discépolo, Agustín Lara. He also covers songs from other musical styles including tango ("Uno"), bossa nova ("Mañana de Carnaval"), and French ("De Quererte Así"). Miguel had performed some of the aforementioned composers' songs on his previous Romance albums.  Miguel recorded Manazero's songs "Voy a Apagar la Luz/Contigo Aprendí" ("I Am Going To Turn Off The Lights/With You I Learned") and "Amanecer" ("To Be Awake"). The two original compositions were "Por Debajo de la Mesa" ("Underneath the Table") by Manzanero and "Contigo (Estar Contigo)" ("To Be With You") by Bebu Silvetti and Sylvia Riera Ibáñez.

Promotion 

Miguel launched his Romances Tour, consisting of 79 concerts, in Las Vegas, Nevada, on 12 September 1997. The performances featured Miguel performing dance-pop and bolero arrangements for two-and-a-half hours.  Adam Sandler of Variety expressed a mixed reaction to the concert in the Universal Amphitheatre in Los Angeles. He noted that Miguel rarely acknowledged his audience or ventured out from center stage. Robert Hilburn of the Los Angeles Times had a more positive reaction, which he described as a "marvelously designed and wonderfully executed blend of Latin music tradition". Another Times contributor, Ernesto Lechner, wrote that Miguel's bolero performance at the Arrowhead Pond arena in California "brought the house down" and stated that the experience at the concert was "pretty close" to Beatlemania. In New York City, Miguel performed five consecutive shows in the Radio City Music Hall. In Mexico City he performed seventeen consecutive concerts in the National Auditorium, where it was the highest-grossing concert by a Latin artist that year. The tour also traveled to South America; including Chile, and Argentina; and continued until May 1998, when Miguel performed throughout Spain. Miguel was the first Latin artist to be inducted to the Pollstar "Top 20 All-Time Grossing Tours" for most tickets sold for consecutive concerts at one venue in 1997.

Singles 

"Por Debajo de la Mesa"  was released as the lead single from the album. The single was released for radio airplay on 15 July 1997, and reached number one on the Billboard Hot Latin Songs chart two months later; it would spend twenty-six weeks on the chart. The music video for the song was filmed at the Rainbow Room in New York City and was directed by Daniela Federici. The second single released, "El Reloj" ("The Clock"), reached number two on the Hot Latin Songs chart, as did the third single, "Contigo (Estar Contigo"). "De Quererte Así (De T'Avoir Aimee)" peaked at number twenty-three on the Hot Latin Songs chart, while "Sabor a Mí" ("Taste From Me") peaked at number six after its release. "Bésame Mucho" ("Kiss Me More") reached number one on the Mexican singles chart and was the among top ten best-performing songs of 1998 in Venezuela according to Record Report.

Critical reception and accolades 

Upon its release, Romances was met with mostly positive reviews by music critics. Terry Jenkins of AllMusic praised the collaborative work of Silvetti and Manzanero and called Romances "a sensuous, enchanting album". Achy Obejas of the Chicago Tribune called Miguel's voice the album's strong point and noted the "presence of electronic instruments and the darker, more somber mood". On the other hand, she felt that Miguel was beginning "to slip", citing the tracks "Jurame" and "Por Debajo de la Mesa" as examples. Fernando Gonzalez wrote for the Orange County Register noting although the album is "Impeccably produced, arranged and recorded", he felt that boleros "demand more than that". Gonzalez elaborated: " He sounds simply loud, rather than romantic, in "Sabor a Mi; he comes across as (soap) operatic rather than tormented in "El Reloj "; he is a star—not a humble student—in "Contigo Aprendi"." The Corpus Christi Caller-Times music critic Rene Carbrera wrote a positive review of the album praising the string arrangements as "elegantly done" and complimented Miguel's take on "Sabor a Mí" and "La Gloria Eres Tu" as he had done it "delightfully done in the traditional way and flavored with Trio Los Panchos requinto "cling" endings." Mario Tarradell of The Dallas Morning News wrote an unfavorable review of the recording; he criticized its productions for having all the tracks "awash in silky keyboards and airy strings with just a hint of percussion in the background". He also panned its lead single "Por Debajo de la Mesa" for coming off as a "love song for the chaste" due to its arrangements being "so stifling, so precious, it's difficult to feel any sensuality".

Los Angeles Times editor Ernesto Lecnher gave the album one-and-a-half out of four stars and claimed that Romances "sinks under its own weight, delivering mostly bloated versions of timeless material". Fellow Los Angeles Times contributor Ed Morales disagreed with his review: "Lechner needs to go into his music room, turn down the lights, snuggle up with his significant other and really listen to 'Romances.' I give his review * and 'Romances' ****" . Anne Valdespino of the Los Angeles Daily News praised the selection of songs and Miguel's performance, calling the performer a "class act". The San Diego Union-Tribune music critic Ernesto Portillo Jr. rated Romances three-out-of four stars and claimed that Miguel's "interpretations are first-rate and the music, with production help from famed composer Armando Manzanero, is executed with exquisite precision". However, he questioned the need for a third in the Romance series as he felt it "diminishes the specialness" of Romance and Segundo Romance noted that not all tracks in the album are "true boleros". El Nuevo Herald editor Eliseo Cardona wrote a mostly positive review of the album. He complimented Miguel's vocals and the productions but stated that Migule's interpretation of "La Gloria Eres Tu" "pales" compared to Lucho Gatica and José José's cover of the song. Ramiro Burr of the San Antonio Express-News said Romances "sparkles with the joy of visiting good friends" and lauded its "timeless music, beautiful orchestration" and complimented Silvetti's arrangements. Burr commented while "we've heard all these classics before, and seemingly a million times" Miguel "does it so well, it hardly seems to matter."

At the 40th Annual Grammy Awards in the 1998, Miguel won the award for Best Latin Pop Performance. Miguel also received a Billboard Latin Music Award for "Male Pop Album of the Year" and a World Music Award for "Best Selling Latin Artist" in the same year.
Miguel received a Premio Amigo and Premio Onda for "Best Latin Singer of the Year" in Spain, and the album was nominated for a Premio Amigo for "Best Latin Album".

Commercial performance 
The album was released on 12 August 1997, in the United States and, by the week of 23 August 1997, it debuted at number two on the Billboard Top Latin Albums chart. A week later it became number one, which it has been for a total of eleven non-consecutive weeks. Romances was even more successful in the Billboard Latin Pop Albums chart, having been number one for 13 weeks. On the Billboard 200 chart it peaked at number fourteen, with sales of over 57,000 units within the first week—a record at that time for a Spanish-language album. It was also Miguel's highest-peaking album in the Billboard 200 until the release of Cómplices in 2008, which peaked at number ten. It was the second best-selling Latin album in the United States during 1997, after Tango by Julio Iglesias. , it has sold 687,000 copies in the US, making it the 19th bestselling Latin album in the country according to Nielsen SoundScan. By October 1997 it had sold over a million copies in Mexico and was certified quadruple platinum in the country, as well as across Central America. A year after release it received a platinum certification in the United States by the RIAA. In Argentina it reached number one on the CAPIF albums chart and was the best-selling album of 1997 in the country, with sales of approximately 781,000 copies. In Spain the album reached number one on the PROMUSICAE chart and was certified nonuple platinum, selling over 900,000 copies. In South America the album was certified gold in Brazil, Platinum in Ecuador and Peru, double platinum in Colombia and Paraguay, sextuple platinum in Venezuela, octuple platinum in Chile, and diamond in Argentina. According to the Guinness World Records Romances was the best-selling Spanish-language album of 1997. A DVD-Audio for the album was released in 2001. Over 4.5 million copies of the album were sold in 53 countries, .

Legacy 
Warner Music released a three-disc compilation album titled Todos Los Romances ("All The Romances") in 1998, which contains all the tracks from Miguel's Romance albums. The album peaked at number twelve in the Billboard Top Latin Albums chart and at number six in the Billboard Latin Pop Albums chart. It was certified gold in Argentina. Romances was followed by one more bolero album, Mis Romances (2001) which was produced by Miguel.

Track listing

Personnel
Adapted from AllMusic and the Romances liner notes:

Performance credits

Bass
Sue Ranney 
Drew Dembowski
Donald Ferrone
Richard Feves
Ed Meares
Bruce Morgenthaler

Cello
Dennis Karmazyn
Suzie Katayama
Miguel Martinez
Jodi Burnett
Larry Corbett
Christine Ermacoff
Todd Hemmenway
Jimbo Ross
David Shamban
Nancy Stein-Ross

Viola
Bob Becker – viola
Denyse Buffman – viola
Matt Funes – viola
Keith Greene – viola
Janet Lakatos – viola
Denyse Buffum – viola
Marlow Fisher – viola
Carrie Holzman – little viola
Jorge Moraga – viola
Harry Shirinian – viola
John Scanlon – viola

Violin
Eun Mee Ahn
Richard Altenbach
Becky Barr
Jacqueline Brand
Roman Volodarsky
Roger Wilkie
Tiffany Yihu
Armen Garabedian
Berj Garabedian
Endre Granat
Alan Grunfield
Pat Johnson
Karen Jones
Peter Kent
Ezra Kliger
Razdan Kuyumjian
Natalie Leggett
Dimitrie Leivici
Mike Markaman
Darius Campo
Joel Derouin
David Ewart
Robin Olson
Carolyn Osborn
Sid Page
Diana Halprin
Tommy Hatwan
Gil Romero
Jay Rosen
Anatoly Rosinsky
Sheldon Sanov
Barbara Porter
Kwihee Shambanari

Vocals
For "La Gloria Eres Tu"
Dan Navarro
Steve Real

For "Bésame Mucho"
Francis Benítez
Zeila Hoyle
Isela Sotelo
Gisa Vatcky

Additional musicians
Abraham Laboriel - Bass Guitar
Alex Acuña – percussion
John Bilezikjian – mandolin
Earl Dumler – oboe
Ramon Flores – trumpet
Jorge "Coco" Trivisonno – bandoneon
Carlos Vega – drums
Richie Gajate Garcia – percussion
Grant Geissman – acoustic guitar
Alan Kaplan – trombone
Jon Kurnick – mandolin
Don Markese – tenor saxophone
Frank Marocco – accordion
Bill Reichenbach Jr. – trombone
Ben Bressel – mandolin
Charlie Davis – trumpet
Bruce Dukov – concert master, violin
Dean Parks – acoustic guitar
Dan Higgins – alto saxophone
Michito Sánchez – percussion
Ramón Stagnaro – requinto
Greg Smith – baritone saxophone

Technical credits

Alejandro Asensi – art coordinator, production coordination
Greg Burns – assistant engineer, mixing assistant
Daniela Federici – photography
Marco Gamboa – assistant engineer, mixing assistant
Mauricio Guerrero – mixing
Jac Holzman – mixing producer
Keith Holzman – production coordination
Armando Manzanero – art direction, composer
Ron McMaster – mastering
Luis Miguel – producer
Gabrielle Raumberger – graphic design
John Rod – assistant engineer, mixing assistant
Benny Faccone– engineer, mixing
Sander Selover – pro-tools
Bebu Silvetti – arranger, composer, mixing producer, musical direction, piano, synthesizer
Jeremy Smith – engineer
H. Thompson – assistant engineer, mixing, mixing assistant

Charts

Weekly charts

Monthly charts

Year-end charts

Certifications and sales

See also 

1997 in Latin music
List of best-selling albums in Argentina
List of best-selling albums in Chile
List of best-selling albums in Mexico
List of best-selling albums in Spain
List of best-selling Latin albums
List of best-selling Latin albums in the United States
List of diamond-certified albums in Argentina
List of number-one Billboard Top Latin Albums from the 1990s
List of number-one albums of 1998 (Spain)

References 

1997 albums
Luis Miguel albums
Albums arranged by Bebu Silvetti
Albums produced by Luis Miguel
Grammy Award for Best Latin Pop Album
Spanish-language albums
Warner Music Latina albums